= Italian Week =

Italian Week, or "Settimana Italiana", was an official Italian Government initiative founded in 2007, and running for 11 years until 2017, Italian Week occurred annually between 26 May and 2 June across Queensland, Australia.
